= Independent Insurance =

Defunct British insurance company

Independent Insurance was an insurer in the United Kingdom for personal lines, automotive and commercial insurance. It was worth £900m at its peak. It failed in 2001 and two of its executives were jailed.
